Acinetobacter albensis is a bacterium from the genus of Acinetobacter which has been isolated from water and soil of the Czech Republic.

References

Moraxellaceae
Bacteria described in 2015